Monmouth was launched at Shields in 1803 as a West Indiaman. Between 1818 and 1821 she made two voyages as a whaler. Afterwards, she started sailing to India. She was wrecked in December 1826 on her way to Calcutta.

Career
Monmouth first appeared in Lloyd's Register in 1811 with Sursler, master, Nockles, owner, and trade London–Jamaica.

In 1814 Monmouths master was R. Quelch. She sailed to Halifax, Nova Scotia, and later was reported to be late in arriving at Bermuda after having been in a gale.

The Register of Shipping for 1818 showed Monmouth with Stewart, master, and trade London–South Seas.

Whaling voyage #1 (1818–1819): Captain Stewart sailed from England on 4 May 1818. He returned  on 22 June 1819 with 500 casks of whale oil.

Whaling voyage #2 (1819–1821): Captain Stewart sailed from England on 20 July 1819. He returned on 27 July 1821 with 550 casks of whale oil, plus fins (baleen).

After her return, Monmouths trade generally became London–Cape of Good Hope.

Lloyd's Register list of ships trading with India for 1826 shows Monmouth, J. Edghill, master, Nockells, owner, and destination Bengal. she reportedly left England on 21 June 1821.

Fate
Monmouth was wrecked on 23 December 1826 near "St. Martino Island" (St. Martin's Island). The crew arrived at Chittagong after eight days in their own boats. She was on a voyage from North Shields, County Durham, to Calcutta.

Citations and references
Citations

References

1809 ships
Age of Sail merchant ships of England
Whaling ships
Maritime incidents in December 1826